Theriodictis is an extinct genus of hypercarnivorous wolf-like canid endemic to South America during the Pleistocene, living from 1.2 Ma- 500,000 years ago and existing for approximately .

Fossil distribution 
The fossil remains are confined to the Tarija Formation of Bolivia, the Chui Formation of southern Brazil, and the Yupoí Formation of northern Argentina. The species T. tarijense was transferred to the genus Protocyon upon phylogenetic analysis.

Description 

It was a large sized canid; body weight for adult specimens of Theriodictis platensis has been estimated at around 30 to 40 kg. The dental diagnostic trait is found in the hypocone of M1 which is reduced in comparison with that of other genera.

Paleoecology 
Prey is thought to have included ungulate camelids (e.g. guanaco), cervids (e.g. Epieurycerus and Antifer), equids (e.g. Equus and Hippidion), peccaries (e.g. Catagonus), giant rodents (e.g. Neochoerus), mesotherids (e.g. the burrowing Mesotherium), and giant cingulates (e.g. Eutatus, Propraopus and Pampatherium).

References

Cerdocyonina
Prehistoric canines
Prehistoric carnivoran genera
Pleistocene carnivorans
Pleistocene genus extinctions
Pleistocene mammals of South America
Ensenadan
Lujanian
Pleistocene Argentina
Fossils of Argentina
Paraná Basin
Pleistocene Bolivia
Fossils of Bolivia
Pleistocene Brazil
Fossils of Brazil
Fossil taxa described in 1891